The 1933 Arkansas Razorbacks football team represented the University of Arkansas as a member of the Southwest Conference (SWC) during the 1933 college football season. In their fifth year under head coach Fred Thomsen, the Razorbacks compiled an overall record of 7–3–1 with a mark of 4–1 in conference play and outscored their opponents by a combined total of 213 to 61. Arkansas was invited to the Dixie Classic, where they tied Centenary.

Arkansas finished first the SWC, but because the Razorbacks has used an ineligible player, conference officials voted not to recognize a champion for the 1933 season. Ulysses "Heine" Schleuter had told coach Thomsen that he had remaining eligibility, but had played at the University of Nebraska in 1931 and 1932 and at the Kemper Military School. Schleuter's status came into question when a student at Southern Methodist University (SMU) saw a newspaper photograph of Schleuter and recognized him as a former Cornhusker.

Schedule

Dixie Classic

The Dixie Classic was the first bowl appearance in Arkansas Razorbacks history. Their opponent, Centenary, was undefeated in the regular season. The game, played in Dallas, was the final Dixie Classic, a predecessor to the Cotton Bowl Classic. The Razorbacks dented the scoreboard first, on a 24-yard hookup from Tom Murphy to Elvin Geiser in the second quarter. The Gentlemen returned with a 20-yard touchdown pass, but missed the extra point to give Arkansas a 7–6 lead. However, a Razorback was called offside, the down was replayed, and Centenary's kicker Chester Weidman's kick was true.

References

Arkansas
Arkansas Razorbacks football seasons
Arkansas Razorbacks football